Andrew John Kennedy (born 8 October 1964) is a Scottish former professional footballer who played as a centre forward.

Kennedy started his career with Rangers, and after making around 20 first-team appearances he spent time at Seiko (Hong Kong) and was then transferred to Birmingham City in March 1985. His goals helped ensure the club's promotion from the Second Division, and in 1985–86, his first full season, he was the club's leading scorer, but with only nine goals for a side which failed to avoid relegation. In 1987, he joined Sheffield United on loan whilst recovering from injury, and then moved to Blackburn Rovers, where he scored 25 goals in two seasons, followed by Watford between 1990 and 1992. A loan spell at Division Three Bolton Wanderers was cut short after one game when Kennedy sustained a back injury. In 1992–93 he joined Division Two club Brighton & Hove Albion, spending two seasons there before finishing his Football League career at Gillingham. Still only 30 years of age, Kennedy moved to Hong Kong with Sing Tao before moving to Northern Ireland with Portadown.

From 2005 Kennedy coached within the Rangers Soccer Schools programme both at home and North America. He scouted and began the career of Cammy Palmer when he was playing at Whitby Bay Soccer Club.

Honours
with Birmingham City
Second Division promotion 1985.

References

External links

1964 births
Birmingham City F.C. players
Blackburn Rovers F.C. players
Bolton Wanderers F.C. players
Brighton & Hove Albion F.C. players
Association football forwards
League of Ireland players
Gillingham F.C. players
Happy Valley AA players
Living people
Footballers from Stirling
Portadown F.C. players
Rangers F.C. players
Scottish expatriate footballers
Scottish Football League players
Scottish footballers
Seiko SA players
Sheffield United F.C. players
Shelbourne F.C. players
English Football League players
Watford F.C. players
Expatriate footballers in Hong Kong
Scottish expatriate sportspeople in Hong Kong